Maar Dhaad is a 1988 Indian Hindi-language action film directed by Yesh Chauhaan and produced by Kanti Shah. The music was composed by Rajesh Roshan.

Plot

Cast
 Navin Nischol as Navin Kumar Bhatija
 Hemant Birje as Shankar
 Mandakini (actress) as Neeta Bhatija 
 Sadashiv Amrapurkar as Babulal/Dr D'Çruz
 Satish Shah
 Puneet Issar as  Police Inspector Sangraam/Jaggu
 Shiva Rindani as Arun
 Manik Irani as Jojo
 Mohan Choti
 Raj Kishore as Property Lawyer of Bhatija
 Shail Chaturvedi as Public Prosecutor/Lawyer
 Huma Khan as Sheeba
 Seema Vaz

Music
" Dream Boy" - Alisha Chinoy
"Michael Ke Adde Pe" - Sadhana Sargam
"Pagal Mann Mera" - Sadhana Sargam, Chandru Atma, Kumar Sanu
"Sun Le Haseena" - Sadhana Sargam, Nitin Mukesh

References

External links
 

1988 films
1988 action films
1980s Hindi-language films
Indian action films
Films scored by Rajesh Roshan